Elections to Rochdale Council were held on 4 May 2006.  One third of the council was up for election and the council stayed under no overall control.  Overall turnout was 32.98%.

After the election, the composition of the council was
Liberal Democrat 30
Labour 20
Conservative 10

Election result

Ward results

External links
2006 Rochdale results

2006 English local elections
2006
2000s in Greater Manchester